Rhyzodiastes convergens is a species of ground beetle in the subfamily Rhysodinae. It was described by R.T. & J.R. Bell in 1985. It is found on the island of New Britain (Bismarck Archipelago, Papua New Guinea).

References

Rhyzodiastes
Beetles of Oceania
Insects of Papua New Guinea
Fauna of New Britain
Beetles described in 1985